Mila Kopp (20 October 1904 – 14 January 1973) was an Austrian stage, film and television actress.

Selected filmography
 Andreas Schlüter (1942)
 The Murder Trial of Doctor Jordan (1949)
 A Very Big Child (1952)
 Hocuspocus (1953)
 Mamitschka (1955)

References

Bibliography
 Goble, Alan. The Complete Index to Literary Sources in Film. Walter de Gruyter, 1999.

External links

1904 births
1973 deaths
Austrian television actresses
Austrian film actresses
Austrian stage actresses
Actresses from Vienna